Learn with Sooty! is part of a British children's television series The Sooty Show promoting educational videos for children to learn from 1989 to 1991. It features the glove puppet characters Sooty, Sweep (who appeared in 1957) and Soo (appeared in 1964), and follows them in their many mischievous adventures. Learn with Sooty! was presented by Matthew Corbett.

Characters
Sooty - A mute yellow bear who is the protagonist of the show. He owns a magic wand whose power is invoked using the words "Izzy wizzy, let's get busy!".
Sweep - A grey dog with a penchant for bones and sausages. He communicates using bizarre squeaks.
Soo - A calm and collected female panda who acts as the foil for both Sooty and Sweep. Voiced by Brenda Longman.

UK VHS releases

See also
Video Collection International

1989 British television series debuts
1991 British television series endings
1980s British children's television series
1990s British children's television series
British television shows featuring puppetry
ITV children's television shows
Television series about bears
Television series by FremantleMedia Kids & Family
Television shows produced by Thames Television
English-language television shows
British children's education television series
Sooty